Trachynotina is a subtribe of darkling beetles in the family Tenebrionidae. There are about 10 genera and more than 170 described species in Trachynotina, found in southern Africa. Although Sepidiini species attract the attention of enthusiasts due to their outstanding morphology and behaviour, the group lacks comprehensive revisions at all taxonomic levels.

Genera
These 10 genera belong to the subtribe Trachynotina:
 Cyrtoderes Dejean, 1834
 Epairopsis Koch, 1955
 Ethmus Haag-Rutenberg-Rutenberg, 1873
 Histrionotus Koch, 1955
 Microphligra Koch, 1955
 Ossiporis Pascoe, 1866
 Oxycerus Koch, 1955
 Somaticus Hope, 1840
 Trachynotus Latreille, 1828
 Trichethmus Gebien, 1937

References

Tenebrionoidea